Giovanni Nuti (born 6 November 1998) is an Italian football player. He plays for Chievo.

Club career
He made his Serie C debut for Gubbio on 13 April 2014 in a game against Paganese.

On 30 August 2019, he was sent on a season-long loan to San Roque de Lepe.

References

External links
 

1998 births
People from Gubbio
Footballers from Umbria
Living people
Italian footballers
Italian expatriate footballers
Association football defenders
A.S. Gubbio 1910 players
A.C. ChievoVerona players
Mosta F.C. players
CD San Roque de Lepe footballers
A.S.D. Città di Foligno 1928 players
Serie C players
Serie D players
Maltese Premier League players
Tercera División players
Italian expatriate sportspeople in Malta
Italian expatriate sportspeople in Spain
Expatriate footballers in Malta
Expatriate footballers in Spain
Sportspeople from the Province of Perugia